Waterfront Park may refer to:

Canada 
 Crystal Beach Waterfront Park, Ontario

China 
Tai Po Waterfront Park, Hong Kong

United States 
California
San Diego County Administration Center#Waterfront Park

District of Columbia
Georgetown Waterfront Park

Hawaii
Kakaako Waterfront Park, Honolulu 

Kentucky
Louisville Waterfront Park, Louisville

Massachusetts
Christopher Columbus Waterfront Park, Boston

New Jersey
Mercer County Waterfront Park, Trenton

Oregon
Tom McCall Waterfront Park, Portland

South Carolina
Waterfront Park (Charleston)

Washington
Waterfront Park (Seattle)
Vancouver Waterfront Park